Nora Istrefi (born 25 March 1986) is a Kosovo Albanian singer.

Life and career

1986–2004: Early life and career beginnings 

Istrefi was born to  Nezir Istrefi and Suzana Tahirsylaj on 25 March 1986 into an Albanian family in the city of Pristina, then part of the Socialist Federal Republic of Yugoslavia, present Kosovo. Istrefi started her professional career at the age of 18.

2005–present: Engjëll and continued success 

She released her first album Engjëll (Angel) in 2005, with songs including "Taxi", which brought her a degree of popularity. During the four coming years she released three albums, Opium in 2006, Another World in 2008 and her self-titled album Nora in 2009. After 2009, she  released a number of songs, including "Le Mama" with Gena, "Big Love", "Ski me ikë". Istrefi is the daughter of Suzana Tahirsylaj, a popular Kosovo-Albanian singer in the 1980s and '90s. Her younger sister Era Istrefi is also a singer. She is in a relationship with Robert Berisha. They were engaged on 22 May 2008 in Pristina. On 2 September 2014, the couple married in Pristina. They have a girl named Renè.

Awards and nominations 

Kenga Magjike

|-
||2013
||"I Jemi Je"
|Discography Award
|
|}

Top Music Awards

|-
|rowspan="1"|2016
|rowspan="1"|"Herself"
|Female Artist of the Year
|
|}

References 

1986 births
Living people
21st-century Albanian women singers
Kosovo Albanians
Kosovan singers
Musicians from Pristina